The 1968 San Francisco 49ers season was the franchise's 19th season in the National Football League, their 23rd overall, and the first for the team with new head coach Dick Nolan.

Offseason

NFL Draft

Roster

Regular season

Schedule

Standings

Awards, records, and honors

References

External links 
 1968 49ers on Pro Football Reference
 49ers Schedule on jt-sw.com

San Francisco 49ers seasons
San Francisco 49ers
San Fran